The Malagasy Revolutionary Party, better known by its Malagasy acronym AREMA (from ), is a political party in Madagascar. It was the ruling party of the Democratic Republic of Madagascar, a Marxist–Leninist one-party socialist state, from 1976 to 1992.

Name 
Although the acronym "AREMA" was maintained in both Malagasy and French, the meaning of the party's name differed between the two languages. In 2020 the party adopted the Malagasy name  for all its official publications, including those in French.

History 
The party was founded on 30 March 1976 as the Vanguard of the Malagasy Revolution, the main political alliance of president Didier Ratsiraka. It held the majority of seats in the parliament until the fall of the Ratsiraka regime in 1991.

AREMA had 455,000 registered members in 1995.

In the elections to the Senate held on 18 March 2001, AREMA won 49 of the 60 elected seats.

In the parliamentary election held on 15 December 2002, AREMA won 4.9% of the popular vote and 3 out of 160 seats in the National Assembly, all three in Toamasina Province.

Pierrot Rajaonarivelo was elected national secretary at a party congress on 29 November 1997. He has been exiled in France since 2002 and has been convicted and sentenced in absentia. Ramaholimasy holds the position while Rajaonarivelo is out of the country.

Currently, AREMA is divided into two antagonistic factions: those behind Rajaonarivelo and those who claim to be supported by the party founder, Ratsiraka.

Rajaonarivelo sought to run in the December 2006 presidential election, but was not allowed to enter the country.

The Ratsiraka faction of the party chose not to participate in the September 2007 parliamentary election, while the Rajaonarivelo faction chose to participate. The Ratsiraka faction sought to prevent the Rajaonarivelo faction's participation, but on 23 August the High Constitutional Court ruled that the Rajaonarivelo faction could participate. AREMA did not win any seats in the election.

AREMA's current national secretary, Simon Pierre, and six deputy national secretaries were elected during the party congress on 12 June 2013.

Ideology 
As the ruling party of the Democratic Republic of Madagascar, AREMA espoused communism and adhered to Marxism–Leninism and scientific socialism. The party maintained close relations with other communist parties around the world, particularly the Workers' Party of Korea. Ratsiraka expressed strong sympathies and support for the Democratic People's Republic of Korea (North Korea). AREMA hosted the International Scientific Seminar on the Juche Idea in Antananarivo from 28 to 30 September 1976. Many prominent party and government officials, public figures, representatives of revolutionary and progressive organizations, scientists and journalists from more than fifty countries attended.

After the dissolution of the Democratic Republic of Madagascar and the country's adoption of a multi-party system, AREMA began to move towards a more moderate left position. The party currently describes itself as "a humanist and ecological social democratic party". The stated goals of the party are to "build healthy and solid foundations for the construction of a social democracy which guarantees sustained and sustainable growth", and to "consolidate and maintain the independence of Madagascar and the freedom of the Malagasy people, for a just and equitable nation".

Election results

Presidential elections

National Assembly elections

References

1976 establishments in Madagascar
Green political parties
Humanist parties
Malagasy nationalism
Parties of one-party systems
Political parties established in 1976
Political parties in Madagascar
Social democratic parties in Africa
Socialism in Madagascar